Inside Straight may refer to:

 A type of poker hand
 Inside Straight (album), an album by jazz saxophonist Cannonball Adderley
 Inside Straight, the first book in the "next-generation Wild Cards triad", edited by George R. R. Martin
 "Inside Straight", a song from the 1989 album Naked City by John Zorn
 Inside Straight (film), a 1951 film starring Mercedes McCambridge
 "Inside Straight", a 1955 science fiction short story by Poul Anderson
 Inside Straight, a jazz quintet led by Christian McBride formed in 2009